Roza may refer to:

People

Last name
Fernando Luiz Roza (b. 1985), Brazilian soccer player
Lita Roza (1926–2008), British singer

First name
Roza Anagnosti (born 1943) Albanian actress
Roza Baglanova (1922–2011), Soviet/Kazakh opera and pop music singer
Roza Chumakova (1924–2007), Russian rower who won two European titles in the single sculls in 1954 and 1955
Roza Eldarova (1923–2021), Soviet/Russian writer and politician
Roza Eskenazi (mid-c. 1890–1980), Jewish-Greek singer
Roza Güclü Hedin (born 1982), Swedish politician
Roza Makagonova (1927–1995), Soviet actress
Roza Miletić (b. 1934), veteran of the Croatian War of Independence
Roza Montazemi (c. 1920–2009), Iranian author of cookbooks
Roza Otunbayeva (b. 1950), Kyrgyz diplomat and politician
Roza Pomerantz-Meltzer (1880–1934), member of the Parliament of Poland in 1922
Roza Robota (1921–1945), participant in the Sonderkommando revolt
Roza Rymbayeva (b. 1957), Soviet/Kazakh singer
Roza Sage (born c. 1950), MP (born c. 1959),  Australian politician
Roza Shanina (1924–1945), Soviet sniper
Roža Piščanec (1923–2006), Slovene painter
Róza Csillag (1832–1892), Austro-Hungarian opera singer

Nickname
Andrej Rozman (b. 1955), a.k.a. Roza, Slovene writer and actor
Roza Terenzi, alias of Australian musician Katie Campbell

Places
Railway Settlement Roza, a town in India
Roza, Russia, several inhabited localities in Russia

Other
ROZA, a political party in Greece
Roza Dam, a diversion dam on the Yakima River in Washington state, United States
Roza (musical), a 1987 musical based on the novel La Vie Devant Soi by Romain Gary
Roza, an alternative form for sawm, a type of fasting regulated by Islamic jurisprudence

See also
Roza Bal, a Muslim shrine in the Khanyaar quarter of the city of Srinagar in Kashmir
Róża (disambiguation)
Rauza, a Perso-Arabic term used in Middle-East and Indian Subcontinent which means shrine or tomb
Rózsa